Lieutenant General Joginder Singh Dhillon (19 November 1914–20 November 2003) was an officer in the British Indian Army and then the Indian Army. Dhillon Born in Jat Sikh Family. He was the first Army Officer to be awarded the Padma Bhushan, given for his role in the 1965 India-Pakistan War, where he was the General Officer Commanding Corps (XI corps).

Career
Dhillon served overseas in the British Indian Army after his 1939 graduation with honours from Thomason Engineering College in Roorkee. His active service during World War II occurred in Burma, Iran and Iraq, following which he spent some time at the Staff College in Quetta. He served as commander of a field company in Malaya during 1945-46 and then briefly of another in Sourabaya.

From 1946 to 1947, Dhillon served as a staff officer in the Engineer-in-Chief's Office and then returned to Quetta as a garrison engineer. He was promoted to lieutenant-colonel in late 1947, becoming GSO1 in the Engineer-in-Chief Branch from October 1947 to February 1948, before being put in charge of the regimental centre of the Bengal Sappers in Roorkee. This centre was soon to become a part of the newly-created Pakistan and thus there were significant administrative preparations during his time there. Among his significant changes, other than those related to the forthcoming split with Pakistan, were measures to end caste-ist practices and to encourage joint celebration by Sikhs and Hindus of their respective significant religious days.

Jawaharlal Nehru visited the Roorkee centre in 1949 and was so impressed that he asked for Dhillon to command the first Republic Day Parade held in Delhi in 1950. On 6 December 1949, by then a major (temporary lieutenant-colonel and acting colonel) Dhillon was promoted to acting brigadier and given command of a brigade.

Dhillon then commanded two infantry brigades and also served as director of technical development and director of weapons and equipment at army headquarters before being promoted to Major General in 1957. As Major General, he was selected to attend a course at Imperial Defence College in the United Kingdom, and returned to a posting at the National Defence College. In August 1960, he was given command of a division, and then he became Deputy Chief of General Staff at Army headquarters when he was promoted to GOC, XI corps in Punjab. He was promoted to substantive lieutenant-general on 17 January 1964.

Role in 2nd India-Pakistan War, 1965
Dhillon, as Commander of XI Corps, was responsible for the Punjab sector during the 1965 India-Pakistan War. He is credited in producing and conducting the battle plan that destroyed or captured over 100 superior Pakistani battle tanks, turning a potentially dangerous defeat into victory, as the Pakistani tanks were poised to head for the Beas Bridge and then on to Delhi.

Frank Moraes, the editor-in-chief of the Indian Express, who spent time on the frontlines, wrote: 

Dhillon was awarded the Padma Bhushan in 1966 for his role in the 1965 war, becoming the first Army officer to receive the award. The citation given for the award was as follows: 

Following the war, Dhillon was promoted to Army Commander of the Central Command, from where he retired on 4 August 1970.

Personal life
Dhillon was married for 62 years to his wife Minnie, who survived him after his death, aged 89, on 20 November 2003. They had three daughters.

Dates of rank

Notes

References

Indian generals
Recipients of the Padma Bhushan in civil service
1914 births
2003 deaths
British Indian Army officers
Generals of the Indo-Pakistani War of 1965